Luan Gabriel (born 3 May 1996, in Roseau) is a Dominican sprinter. At the 2012 Summer Olympics, she competed in the Women's 200 metres event, but was eliminated in the first round.

References

External links
World Athletics
Eastern Shore Hawks

1996 births
Living people
Dominica female sprinters
Olympic athletes of Dominica
Athletes (track and field) at the 2012 Summer Olympics
People from Roseau
Olympic female sprinters